Olga Kochetkova (born 1 November 1979) is a retired Russian backstroke swimmer who won a silver medal in the 4×100 m medley relay at the 1997 European Aquatics Championships. She also competed in the 100 m backstroke at the 1996 Summer Olympics.

References

1979 births
Living people
Russian female swimmers
Olympic swimmers of Russia
Swimmers at the 1996 Summer Olympics
Russian female backstroke swimmers
European Aquatics Championships medalists in swimming